Paul De Weert (born 27 November 1945) is a Belgian rower. He competed at the 1972 Summer Olympics and the 1976 Summer Olympics.

References

External links
 

1945 births
Living people
Belgian male rowers
Olympic rowers of Belgium
Rowers at the 1972 Summer Olympics
Rowers at the 1976 Summer Olympics
Sportspeople from Antwerp